Frank Anthony Okrie (October 27, 1896 – October 16, 1959), nicknamed "Lefty", was a Major League Baseball (MLB) pitcher.

Okrie appeared in 21 games for the 1920 Detroit Tigers, recording a 1-2 win–loss record with a 5.27 earned run average.

Okrie was the father of MLB catcher and coach Len Okrie.

References

External links

1896 births
1959 deaths
Major League Baseball pitchers
Baseball players from Detroit
Detroit Tigers players
London Tecumsehs (baseball) players
Toledo Mud Hens players
Omaha Buffaloes players
Sioux City Packers players